Devinder Pal Singh Bhullar (born 26 May 1965 in Punjab, India) is a convicted Terrorist. He was convicted by a TADA court in a 1993 Delhi bomb blast case that left nine people dead and injured 31. The Indian supreme court had confirmed his death sentence in a fractured and divided decision. His death sentence has been commuted to life imprisonment by the Supreme Court of India on 31 March 2014.

A chemical engineering professor by profession, he taught in Ludhiana before his conviction for a bomb blast in Delhi. He was declared guilty—under India's Terrorism and Disruptive Activities (Prevention) Act (TADA), of killing nine bystanders in a 1993 car bombing intended to kill politician Maninderjeet Singh Bitta, and sentenced to death by hanging by a split decision. The Supreme Court of India commuted his death sentence to life Imprisonment on 31 March 2014, both on the ground of an unexplained and inordinate delay of eight years in deciding his mercy petition and on the ground of mental illness.

Crime

On 11 September 1993, a car bomb exploded outside the offices of the Indian Youth Congress on Raisina Road in New Delhi, killing nine people. The remote-controlled bomb used RDX as explosive. The primary target for the mid-day bombing was identified as Maninder Singh Bitta, a vocal critic of Khalistani separatists, who was leaving the Youth Congress offices in his car. Bitta survived the attack with shrapnel wounds to his chest. However, two of Bitta's body guards were killed.

After investigation, authorities named Bhullar as the bomber responsible for the 1993 Raisina Road car bomb. Bhullar's sympathizers argue that he was targeted solely for supporting the Khalistani separatist cause and for speaking out against injustices in Punjab during the 1980s, in particular students missing after police encounters, Operation Woodrose and the 1984 sikh killing. The prosecution claimed that he was part of the proscribed separatist organization, Khalistan Liberation Force. However, his family and friends deny this claim.

In the appellate stage of the trial he was found guilty by a majority of 2–1. The two judges who upheld the death sentence have found his confession admissible. The dissenting Judge, presiding judge of the three-judge bench, however, acquitted the accused, finding that he was not guilty of participating in the 1993 car bomb attack and too much doubt remained on the authenticity of the alleged confession to the Punjab police. However, the other two judges convicted him, arguing that proof "beyond reasonable doubt" should be a "guideline, not a fetish". Bhullar was named responsible based on his confession; but the defense claims that it was taken under duress.

Devinder Pal Singh Bhullar has gone in appeal over the judgement of the trial court and his conviction was upheld at all the stages. Finally, a Presidential pardon was sought by him and granted on ground of inordinate delay in deciding his mercy petition and his schizophrenia.

Flight to Germany and attempted asylum

After the bombing, Bhullar fled to Germany in December 1994 and sought political asylum. His plea was rejected by the German government in 1995 and he was extradited back to India to face charges of terrorism although on the basis of Bhullar receiving a fair trial and not being subjected to capital punishment. Upon his return to India in 1995, Bhullar was immediately arrested and prosecuted for alleged bombings in Delhi. He was treated as a terrorist and prosecuted under the Terrorism & Disruptive Activities Act (TADA).

Bhullar has been in prison on death row for the last two decades since being arrested upon arrival after being deported to India.

Confession

On being handed over to the Indian police in Delhi by airline staff, Bhullar was taken into detention. The police alleged that he volunteered a confession, which was typed on a computer while Bhullar spoke but according to the authorities the secretary forgot to save the confession on the computer. Terrorist and Disruptive Activities (Prevention) Act requires the confession to be handwritten or an audio/video record of it to be kept. The authenticity of typed confessions is doubted in the courts.

Court proceedings

In India, Bhullar was prosecuted for the 1993 New Delhi car bombing. He was found guilty by the trial court and sentenced to death by hanging on 25 August 2001. The rest of the accused have been acquitted. Bhullar was then taken before an ‘executive’ magistrate. Terrorist and Disruptive Activities (Prevention) Act requires the confession document be sent to the magistrate before appearance of the person so that the magistrate is in a position to examine it. The confession document was not sent to the magistrate nevertheless the magistrate went on to ask him if he had made the confession. Bhullar wrote to the court that the ‘confession’ was involuntary and obtained under torture and fear of death.

In a 2002 review of the trial, an appeals court upheld Bhullar's death sentence by a split verdict of 2–1. The presiding judge voted to overturn the death penalty on Bhullar, because the testimony of the prosecution witnesses had been at odds with the account of events in Bhullar's self-confession. However, the other judges upheld the death penalty because Bhullar's confession had not been sent to the trial magistrate, it was not the basis for the conviction and Bhullar had withdrawn his confession.

While he was waiting for the death sentence, Bhullar was convicted of other charges by the Punjab Police. However, on 1 December 2006 in the Chandigarh and Haryana High Court the judge acquitted Bhullar on the basis of lack of evidence. R.S. Baswana Additional Sessions Judge held that there was no evidence on file to link the accused with the other alleged crimes and despite the fact that the prosecution had 15 years to gather evidence against Bhullar, they were unable to produce evidence linking Mr Bhullar to the case against him. He had filed a review petition, which was also dismissed on 17 December 2002. Bhullar had then moved a curative petition, which too had been rejected by the Supreme Court on 12 March 2003.

Bhullar's appeal against the conviction was dismissed by the Supreme Court of India on 27 December 2006. His plea for clemency was rejected by the President of India in May 2011. In September 2011, the Supreme Court allowed Bhullar to file an unprecedented second appeal against the death sentence. The amendment to the appeal will argue that Bhullar's first appeal against the death sentence should have been heard by a Constitution Bench of the Supreme Court, rather than a Trial Bench. Additional pleas in the appeal will include the arguments that Bhullar's death sentence had been upheld by a 2–1 split verdict and that Bhullar was mentally ill due to the delay in his execution. The appeal will hence request that his death sentence be commuted to life in prison. In April 2013, the Supreme Court upheld his death penalty after considering a mercy plea.

The writ petition which was filed in Supreme Court of India in April 2013 was only against the plea that delay in execution of death sentence should be a ground for converting death sentence into life imprisonment. The Supreme Court rejected the plea in April 2013, by holding that in terror crime cases pleas of delay in execution of death sentence cannot be a mitigating factor.

In 2005, Bhullar wrote to the German chancellor to put diplomatic pressure on Indian Government to release him. The letter was later made public. Bhullar appealed against his execution on the grounds that his petition for mercy was kept pending by the President of the country for eight years, an unnecessary delay.

On 31 January 2014, the Supreme Court of India issued notice to Central Government on Bhullar's curative plea seeking commuting his death sentence to life imprisonment. The plea was on the grounds of inordinate delay in deciding his mercy plea by the President and his mental health.

On 31 March 2014, a bench of the Supreme Court, headed by Chief Justice P Sathasivam, commuted Bhullar's death sentence to life Imprisonment on the grounds of inordinate delay in deciding his mercy petition and his schizophrenia.

Campaign for clemency

The European Parliament passed a resolution stating that India should abolish the death penalty and grant clemency to Bhullar. Amnesty International has also taken up the cause, launching an "Urgent Appeal" for petitions against the execution.

The Chief Minister Of Delhi, Arvind Kejriwal, wrote to the President of India recommending clemency for Devinder Pal Singh Bhullar.

References 

Indian people imprisoned on charges of terrorism
Living people
People extradited from Germany
People extradited to India
1965 births
People convicted of murder by India
People from Ludhiana
Indian prisoners sentenced to death
Indian prisoners sentenced to life imprisonment
Prisoners sentenced to death by India
Prisoners sentenced to life imprisonment by India
Supreme Court of India cases
People convicted on terrorism charges